The Harmon Engineering Company was an American aircraft manufacturer based in Howe, Texas. The company specialized in aircraft plans for amateur construction.

The company's original design, given the German name, Harmon Der Donnerschlag is a simple, open cockpit, single-seat mid-wing aircraft, built with a welded 4130 steel tube fuselage and wooden-framed wings, all covered in doped aircraft fabric covering. The aircraft was later developed into the Harmon Mister America, which uses the same construction methods and has a similar lay-out. Both designs also employ inexpensive automotive Volkswagen air-cooled engines.

Aircraft

References

Defunct aircraft manufacturers of the United States
Homebuilt aircraft